Ludmila Ulehla (1923–2009) was an American composer and music educator.

Biography
Ludmila Ulehla was born in Flushing, Queens, New York. She began the study of piano and violin very early and wrote short compositions at the age of five. Later she studied composition under Vittorio Giannini at the Manhattan School of Music and was awarded a master's degree. Ulehla took a position on the faculty of the same school in 1947, and was Chair of the Composition Department from 1972 to 1989.

Ulehla was named Outstanding Educator in Who’s Who of American Women, and has received ASCAP awards. She wrote a book entitled Contemporary Harmony – Romanticism Through the 12-Tone Row which was published by Advance Music.

Works
Ulehla's compositions were primarily for solo and chamber ensembles. Selected works include:

Elegy for a Whale
Gargoyles for Hindell
Michelangelo for Orchestra
Remembrances for Heifetz
Unrolling a Chinese Scroll
Sybil of the American Revolution, chamber opera, 1993
Undersea Fantasy for Orchestra, 1999
Sonata for Improvisation for clarinet, soprano saxophone and piano.

References

1923 births
20th-century classical composers
American music educators
American women classical composers
American classical composers
2009 deaths
American opera composers
People from Flushing, Queens
Manhattan School of Music alumni
Manhattan School of Music faculty
Women in classical music
American women in electronic music
Women opera composers
20th-century American women musicians
20th-century American composers
Women music educators
20th-century women composers
American women academics
21st-century American women